The Trans-Canyon Telephone line in Grand Canyon National Park crosses the Grand Canyon from the South Rim to the North Rim via the Inner Canyon. On the south side of the Canyon, the phone line left the South Rim developed area by Bright Angel Lodge, went down Pipe Creek, and crossed the Colorado River. On the north side, the phone line followed Bright Angel Creek up to the rim to the Wylie Way Tourist Camp before the construction of the Grand Canyon Inn. The line was in place by 1924  and was altered in 1938-39 by the Civilian Conservation Corps. It has been unchanged since then. Telephone lines are supported using 592 assemblies of  galvanized pipes and fittings, which could be easily transported and assembled with minimal impact to the canyon environment. It is a rare surviving example of open-wire copper -weld technology. A spur line ran along the South Kaibab Trail to the Tipoff.

The line was placed on the National Register of Historic Places on May 13, 1986.

See also
Architects of the National Park Service

References

Buildings and structures in Grand Canyon National Park
Civilian Conservation Corps in Arizona
Grand Canyon
Telecommunications buildings on the National Register of Historic Places
National Register of Historic Places in Coconino County, Arizona
Park buildings and structures on the National Register of Historic Places in Arizona
1934 establishments in Arizona
Buildings and structures in Coconino County, Arizona
National Register of Historic Places in Grand Canyon National Park